Al-Samawʾal ibn Yaḥyā al-Maghribī (c. 1130 – c. 1180), commonly known as Samau'al al-Maghribi, was a mathematician, astronomer and physician. Born to a Jewish family, he concealed his conversion to Islam for many years in fear of offending his father, then openly embraced Islam in 1163 after he had a dream telling him to do so. His father was a Rabbi from Morocco.

Mathematics
Al-Samaw'al wrote the mathematical treatise al-Bahir fi'l-jabr, meaning "The brilliant in algebra", at the age of nineteen.

He also used the two basic concepts of mathematical induction, though without stating them explicitly. He used this to extend results for the binomial theorem up to n=12 and Pascal's triangle previously given by al-Karaji.

Polemics

He also wrote a famous polemic book in Arabic debating Judaism known as Ifḥām al-Yahūd (Confutation of the Jews). A Latin tract translated from Arabic and later translated into many Western languages, titled Epistola Samuelis Marrocani ad R. Isaacum contra errores Judaeorum, claims to be authored by a certain R. Samuel of Fez "about the year 1072" and is erroneously connected with him.

Notes

References

 Samau'al al-Maghribi: Ifham Al-Yahud: Silencing the Jews by Moshe Perlmann, Proceedings of the American Academy for Jewish Research, Vol. 32, Samau'al Al-Maghribi Ifham Al-Yahud: Silencing the Jews (1964)
Samaw'al al-Maghribi: Ifham al-yahud, The early recension, by مغربي، السموءل بن يحي، d. ca. 1174. al-Samawʼal ibn Yaḥyá Maghribī; Ibrahim Marazka; Reza Pourjavady; Sabine Schmidtke Publisher: Wiesbaden : Harrassowitz, 2006. 
Perlmann, Moshe, "Eleventh-Century Andalusian Authors on the Jews of Granada" Proceedings of the American Academy for Jewish Research 18 (1948–49):269-90.

External links
Al-Bahir en Algebre d'As-Samaw'al translation by Salah Ahmad, Roshdi Rashed, Author(s) of Review: David A. King, Isis, Vol. 67, No. 2 (Jun., 1976), pp. 307-308
Al-Asturlabi and as-Samaw'al on Scientific Progress, Osiris, Vol. 9, 1950 (1950), by Franz Rosenthal, pp. 555–566
  (PDF version)

Astronomers of the medieval Islamic world
Physicians of the medieval Islamic world
Medieval Jewish astronomers
12th-century mathematicians
Mathematicians of the medieval Islamic world
Converts to Islam from Judaism
People from Baghdad
Year of birth uncertain
Islam and antisemitism
Medieval Persian Jews
12th-century Jews
12th-century physicians
Medieval Jewish physicians
Jews from the Abbasid Caliphate
12th-century births
12th-century deaths
12th-century astronomers
Iraqi people of Moroccan descent
12th-century people from the Abbasid Caliphate
Jewish astronomers